Glipa luteofasciata is a species of beetle in the genus Glipa. It was described in 1930.

References

luteofasciata
Beetles described in 1930